Patrick Leonard (1877 – after 1899) was a Scottish professional footballer who played as a forward, primarily at outside left.

Career
Leonard began his football career with St Mirren in his native Scotland before moving to England, where he joined Manchester City. He made 16 appearances during the 1897–98 season in the league and FA Cup, and then headed south again. He played for Southern League clubs New Brompton and then Thames Ironworks, for whom he scored eight goals from 10 games. In his first game, a friendly against Upton Park, Leonard scored a hat-trick. His first league goals for The Ironworks came on 21 January 1899 in an away game at Wolverton LNWR in what was their 13th game of a 22-game season. With Wolverton fellow contenders for promotion, 200 spectators saw Leonard score twice in a 4–3 victory.

His final goal and game was on 22 April 1899 in a 1898–99 Southern League Second Division decider against Cowes, to determine the overall winners. The game was played at a neutral venue, on a pitch behind The Lord Nelson pub on East Ferry Road, home of Millwall Athletic. This was despite the ground being only three miles from Memorial Grounds, home of Thames Ironworks and considerably further from Cowes' home ground on the Isle of Wight, a decision which had infuriated Cowes management. Leonard scored the third goal in a 3–1 victory after earlier goals for Thames Ironworks by David Lloyd and Henderson.

After a five-month spell with Canning Town, Leonard returned to Manchester City, for whom he made one last appearance, scoring the opening goal in a 4–1 defeat of Bury in September 1899.

References

1877 births
Year of death missing
Scottish footballers
St Mirren F.C. players
Manchester City F.C. players
Gillingham F.C. players
Thames Ironworks F.C. players
Scottish Football League players
English Football League players
Southern Football League players
Date of birth missing
Place of birth missing
Place of death missing
Association football forwards